Shigeo Gochō (November 2, 1946 – June 2, 1983) was a Japanese photographer.

Early life
Shigeo was born in Kamo, Niigata Prefecture in 1946. As a child he suffered from Pott's Disease, a type of vertebral infection caused by tuberculosis. The treatment for the disease meant that Shigeo had to wear a lower body cast for an extended period of time.

Career
In 1977 he published the book Self and Others. His work is included in the collections of the Museum of Fine Arts Houston, the San Francisco Museum of Modern Art, and the British Museum.

References

Japanese photographers
Street photographers
1946 births
1983 deaths